The first Messerschmitt Me 209 was a single-engine racing aircraft which was designed for and succeeded at breaking speed records. This Me 209 was a completely new aircraft whose designation was used by Messerschmitt as a propaganda tool. Although the aircraft was designed only to break speed records, it was hoped that its name would associate it with the Bf 109 already in combat service.

The designation Me 209 was given for propaganda purposes to cause confusion with the Messerschmitt Bf 109, the Luftwaffes primary fighter throughout World War II. It was later reused for the actual proposed successor to the Bf 109.

Design and development
The designation Me 209 was used for two separate projects during World War II. The first was a record-setting, single-engined race aircraft, for which little or no consideration was given to adaptation for combat. The second Me 209 was a proposal for a follow-up to the highly successful Messerschmitt Bf 109 which served as the Luftwaffe's primary fighter throughout World War II.

Designed in 1937, the Me 209 was a completely separate aircraft from the Bf 109, solely designed to break speed records. It shared only its Daimler-Benz DB 601 engine with the Bf 109, which in the Me 209 was equipped with steam cooling. Willy Messerschmitt designed the small aircraft with a cockpit placed far back along the fuselage just in front of its unique cross-shaped tail section. Unlike the Bf 109, the Me 209 featured a wide track, inwardly-retracting undercarriage mounted in the wing section.

Testing
	

The aircraft achieved its purpose when test pilot Fritz Wendel flew it to a new world speed record of almost 756 km/h (469 mph) on 26 April 1939, bearing the German civil registration D-INJR. This record was not officially broken by another piston-engined aircraft until 16 August 1969 by Darryl Greenamyer's highly modified Conquest I F8F Bearcat, now at the Smithsonian's NASM. The Me 209 V1's speed record was itself shattered in terms of absolute speed, eighteen months later by Heini Dittmar, flying another Messerschmitt aircraft design, the Me 163A V4 rocket fighter prototype to a 1,004 km/h (624 mph) record in October 1941.

The idea of adapting the Me 209 racer to the fighter role gained momentum when, during the Battle of Britain, the Bf 109 failed to gain superiority over the RAF Supermarine Spitfire. The little record-setter, however, was not up to the task of air combat. Its wings were almost completely occupied by the engine's liquid cooling system and therefore prohibited conventional installation of armament. The aircraft also proved difficult to fly and extremely hard to control on the ground. Nevertheless, the Messerschmitt team made several attempts to improve the aircraft's performance by giving it longer wings, a taller vertical stabilizer, and installing two synchronized 7.92 mm (.312 in) MG 17 machine guns in the engine cowling. Its various modifications, however, added so much weight that the Me 209 ended up slower than the contemporary Bf 109E. This first Me 209 project was soon cancelled.

Propaganda use
The Me 209's designation was used by Messerschmitt as a propaganda tool. Although the aircraft was a "single purpose" high-speed experimental prototype, it was hoped that its name would associate it and its world-beating performance with the Bf 109 already in combat service.

In 1939, the speed record achievement of the Me-209 was used for a propaganda disinformation campaign, wherein the aircraft (possibly from its post-July 1938 first flight date) was given the designation Me 109R, with the later prefix, never used for wartime Bf 109 fighters. This disinformation was naturally designed to give an aura of invincibility to the Bf 109, an aura not dispelled until the conclusion of the Battle of Britain.

Surviving aircraft

The fuselage of the Me 209 V1 is currently on display, at the Polish Aviation Museum in Kraków, Poland and was once a part of Hermann Göring's personal collection.

Specifications (Me 209 V1)

See also

Notes

Bibliography
 Feist, Uwe. The Fighting Me 109. London: Arms and Armour Press, 1993. .
 Green, William. War Planes of the Second World War, Fighters, vol. I. London: Hanover House, 1960.
 Jackson, Robert. Infamous Aircraft: Dangerous Designs and their Vices. Barnsley, Yorkshire, UK: Pen and Sword Aviation, 2005. .

 Lepage, Jean-Denis G.G. Aircraft of the Luftwaffe, 1935-1945: An Illustrated Guide. Jefferson, North Carolina: McFarland & Company, 2009. .
 Matthews, Birch  Race with the Wind: How Air Racing Advanced Aviation Zenith Imprint, 2001.
 Nowarra, Heinz J. Die Deutsche Luftrüstung 1933–1945: Band 3 Flugzeugtypen Henschel - Messerschmitt (in German).  Bonn, Germany: Bernard & Graefe Verlag, 1993. .
 Stüwe, Botho. Peenemünde West (in German). Augsburg, Bavaria, Germany: Bechtermünz Verlag, 1999. .
 Wagner, Ray and Heinz J. Nowarra. German Combat Planes: A Comprehensive Survey and History of the Development of German Military Aircraft from 1914 to 1945. New York: Doubleday & Company, 1971.

External links

Famous Record-Breaking and Racing Aircraft: Messerschmitt Me 209 V1

Me 209
1930s German sport aircraft
Single-engined tractor aircraft
Low-wing aircraft
Racing aircraft
Aircraft first flown in 1938